The Cantalloc Aqueducts are a series of aqueducts located  west of the city of Nazca, Peru, built by the Nazca culture. More than 40 aqueducts were built, which were used all year round. There are other aqueducts in different parts of the city.

They are part of a system of aqueducts of the same type called puquios that were built by the pre-Inca civilization of Nazca about 1,500 years ago.

The aqueducts ensured the supply of water to the city of Nazca and the surrounding fields, allowing the cultivation of cotton, beans, potatoes, and other crops in an arid region.

Gallery

See also 
 Puquios
 Tamagawa Aqueduct
 Thirlmere Aqueduct
 Mathur Aqueduct

References

External links
location

Aqueducts in Peru
Archaeological sites in Ica Region
Archaeological sites in Peru
Archaeological museums in Peru